The 1986 SMU Mustangs football team represented Southern Methodist University (SMU) as a member of the Southwest Conference (SWC) during the 1986 NCAA Division I-A football season. Led by Bobby Collins in his fifth season as head coach, the Mustangs compiled an overall record 6–5 with a mark of 5–3 in conference play, tying for fourth place in the SWC. 

After the season, SMU was sanctioned by the NCAA for repeated major rules violations. Since the most recent round of violations occurred after an NCAA rule involving punishing repeat offenders was instituted, the football program was not only hit with even harsher sanctions, but was also suspended from competition for the following season; the effects of the sanctions would eventually lead SMU to miss an additional season and resume play in 1989 under head coach Forrest Gregg, who was hired after Collins resigned in the aftermath of the investigation.

Schedule

Personnel
QB Bobby Watters, Jr.
OT David Richards, Jr.

References

SMU
SMU Mustangs football seasons
SMU Mustangs football